Barikeh-ye Farkhinevand (also Romanized as Bārīkeh-ye Farkhīnehvand; also known as Bārīkeh and Bārīkeh-ye Soflá) is a village in Ghaleh Rural District, Zagros District, Chardavol County, Ilam Province, Iran. At the 2006 census, its population was 149, in 26 families. The village is populated by Kurds.

References 

Populated places in Chardavol County
Kurdish settlements in Ilam Province